Iozefina Ștefănescu (née Ugron; 3 January 1932 – 25 October 2015) was a Romanian handballer who played for the Romanian national team. She was the captain of the Romania national team that won the 1962 IHF World Championship. At club level, she played for ICEF București or Știința București.

International trophies  
Outdoor World Championship
Gold Medalist: 1956, 1960
Indoor World Championship:
Gold Medalist: 1962

References

 
 
1932 births
2015 deaths 
People from Covasna
Romanian female handball players

Romanian sportspeople of Hungarian descent